Soyuz TM-2 was a crewed spaceflight to the Soviet space station Mir, which was uncrewed at the time. TM-2 was launched on February 5, 1987, and it was first crewed spaceflight of the Soyuz-TM spacecraft, and the second crewed spaceflight to Mir (the first being Soyuz T-15). The crew of the long duration expedition, Mir EO-2, who were launched by TM-2 consisted of Soviet cosmonauts Yuri Romanenko and Aleksandr Laveykin.

The spacecraft remained docked to Mir, functioning as a lifeboat for the EO-2 crew, until July 1987 when it returned to Earth carrying Laveykin and the two man crew of Mir EP-1. Romanenko later returned to Earth in Soyuz TM-3 at the end of EO-2.

Crew

Mission parameters
Mass: 7100 kg
Perigee: 341 km
Apogee: 365 km
Inclination: 51.6°
Period: 91.6 minutes

Mission highlights

Early in the expedition EO-2, the module Kvant-1 was launched to automatically dock with Mir. The docking system, known as the "Igla system", was not behaving as expected. On April 5 the EO-2 crew retreated to the Soyuz TM-2 spacecraft so that they could escape in the event the module got out of control. About 200 m out, the docking system lost its lock on Mir's aft port antenna. The cosmonauts watched from within Soyuz TM-2 as the Kvant/ FSM combination passed within 10 m of the station. Following an emergency spacewalk, Kvant fully docked to the station on April 11.

References

Crewed Soyuz missions
1987 in spaceflight
1987 in the Soviet Union
Spacecraft which reentered in 1987
Spacecraft launched in 1987